Bimbourie is a locality situated in the Mallee region.  The place by road, is situated about 13 kilometres from Nandaly and 22 kilometres from Sea Lake, Victoria.

The place name Bimbourie is thought to be derived from the local Aboriginal word Bimbogrie meaning "well dug by Aborigines".

Bimbourie Post Office opened on 9 June 1911 and closed in 1914.

Notes and references

Towns in Victoria (Australia)
Mallee (Victoria)